The Martian Moons eXploration (MMX) is a robotic space probe set for launch in 2024 to bring back the first samples from Mars' largest moon Phobos. Developed by the Japanese Aerospace Exploration Agency (JAXA) and announced on 9 June 2015, MMX will land and collect samples from Phobos once or twice, along with conducting Deimos flyby observations and monitoring Mars' climate.

The mission aims to provide key information to help determine whether the Martian moons are captured asteroids or the result of a larger body hitting Mars. The Japan Aerospace Exploration Agency and other Japanese government officials officially approved the MMX project to proceed into development on 19 February 2020, according to a post on JAXA's website.

Overview 

The spacecraft will enter orbit around Mars, then transfer to Phobos, and land once or twice and gather sand-like regolith particles using a simple pneumatic system. The lander mission aims to retrieve a minimum  of samples. The spacecraft will then take off from Phobos and make several flybys of the smaller moon Deimos before sending the Return Module back to Earth, arriving in July 2029.

The mission architecture uses three modules: Propulsion module (1800 kg), Exploration module (150 kg) and the Return module (1050 kg). With the mass of Deimos and Phobos being too small to capture a satellite, it is not possible to orbit the Martian moons in the usual sense. However, orbits of a special kind, referred to as quasi-satellite orbits (QSO), can be sufficiently stable to allow many months of operations in the vicinity of the moon.

The mission leader is Yasuhiro Kawakatsu.

International collaboration 
NASA, ESA, and CNES are also participating in the project, and will provide scientific instruments. The U.S. will contribute a neutron and gamma-ray spectrometer called MEGANE (an acronym for Mars-moon Exploration with GAmma rays and NEutrons, which also means "eyeglasses" in Japanese), and France (CNES) the Near IR Spectrometer (NIRS4/MacrOmega). France is also contributing expertise in flight dynamics to plan the mission's orbiting and landing manoeuvres.

Development and testing of key components, including the sampler, is ongoing. As of 2020, MMX is scheduled to be launched in September 2024, and will return to Earth five years later.

Scientific payload 
The scientific payload consists on Japanese and international contributions:

 TENGOO - TElescopic Nadir imager for GeOmOrphology, a narrow field camera for detailed terrain study
 OROCHI - Optical RadiOmeter composed of CHromatic Imagers, a wide field visible light camera
 LIDAR - Light Detection and Ranging, uses a laser to reflect light from the moon's surface, to study surface altitude and albedo
 MIRS - MMX InfraRed Spectrometer, a near-infrared observation device for characterizing the minerals that make up the moons of Mars. Developed in partnership with CNES, France
 MEGANE - (MEGANE means "eyeglasses" in Japanese) Mars-moon Exploration with GAmma rays and NEutrons, a gamma-ray and neutron spectrometer developed in partnership with NASA
 CMDM - Circum-Martian Dust Monitor, a dust counting device for characterizing the environment around the Martian moons
 MSA - Mass Spectrum Analyzer, an instrument to study the ion environment around Mars

JAXA will partner with the Japan Broadcasting Corporation (NHK) to develop the "Super Hi-Vision Camera" which combines a 4K and 8K camera, making it the first time that Mars will be imaged in 8K resolution. Images will be regularly transmitted back to Earth with flight data, in order to recreate MMX exploration around Mars and its moons. The original image data will be stored in a recording device in MMX's return capsule and brought back to Earth as part of the sample-return portion of the mission.

Additionally, the Gravity GradioMeter (GGM), Laser-Induced Breakdown Spectroscope (LIBS), Mission Survival Module (MSM) were proposed as additional instruments.

Following a study by the French CNES space agency, it was decided that the spacecraft will deliver a small rover provided by CNES and the German Aerospace Center (DLR). The rover will be equipped with cameras, a radiometer, and a Raman spectrometer for in-situ surface exploration of the Martian moon.

Sampling 
MMX's sampler is equipped with two sampling methods: the Coring Sampler (C-SMP) to gain regolith at depths deeper than 2 cm from the Phobos surface, and the Pneumatic Sampler (P-SMP) from the Phobos surface. The robotic arm will collect regolith from the ground by shooting the C-SMP mechanism. The C-SMP mechanism is designed to rapidly perform subsurface sampling to collect over 10 grams of the regolith. It is equipped with an ejecting actuator that uses a special shape memory alloy, SCSMA. P-SMP that is installed nearby the footpad of the landing leg uses an air gun to puff pressurised gas, pushing about 10 grams of soil into the sample container. Both C-SMP and P-SMP can collect samples quickly because the entire sampling procedure shall be performed only in 2.5 hours.

After taking off from the landing site, the equipped robotic arm transfers both C-SMP and P-SMP canister to the sample return capsule. The spacecraft will then take off from Phobos and make several flybys of the smaller moon Deimos before carrying the Sample Return Capsule back to Earth, arriving in July 2029.

See also 
 Fobos-Grunt
 Mars sample-return mission

References

External links 
 Mission website at JAXA.jp

Japanese space probes
Landers (spacecraft)
Missions to Mars
Phobos (moon)
Sample return missions
Proposed space probes
2024 in spaceflight